Hartmanthus is a genus of tropical, succulent flowering plants in the family Aizoaceae, native to the lower Orange River in ǁKaras, Namibia and Northern Cape, South Africa.

Description
Plants grow as densely leaved dwarf shrubs. Their leaves are up to 70mm long, 15mm wide, and 20mm thick; they have a smooth, firm surface and remain attached for years after drying out. Inflorescence is in the form of 75-117 white to pink flowers 45-55mm in size; internodes are orange. Its seeds are egg-shaped, reddish-brown and are 0.9mm to 1mm in length.

Taxonomy
Plants in Hartmanthus were placed in Delosperma by Louisa Bolus and were separated in 1995.

Species
 Hartmanthus hallii (L. Bolus)
 Hartmanthus pergamentaceus (L. Bolus)

References

Aizoaceae
Aizoaceae genera
Flora of Namibia
Flora of South Africa
Flora of Southern Africa
Succulent plants